The following lists events that happened during 1953 in Jordan.

Incumbents
Monarch: Hussein 
Prime Minister: Tawfik Abu al-Huda (until 5 May), Fawzi al-Mulki (starting 5 May)

Events

May
 May 2 - Hussein is crowned King of Jordan.

See also
 Years in Iraq
 Years in Syria
 Years in Saudi Arabia

References

 
1950s in Jordan
Jordan
Jordan
Years of the 20th century in Jordan